This article lists important figures and events in the public affairs of British Malaya during the year 1927, together with births and deaths of prominent Malayans.

Incumbent political figures

Central level 
 Governor of Federated of Malay States and Unfederated of Malay States, Governor of Straits Settlements: Laurence Nunns Guillemard (until 3 June); Sir Hugh Clifford (from 3 June)

State level 
  Perlis :
 Raja of Perlis : Syed Alwi Syed Saffi Jamalullail
  Johore :
 Sultan of Johor : Sultan Ibrahim Al-Masyhur
  Kedah :
 Sultan of Kedah : Sultan Abdul Hamid Halim Shah
  Kelantan :
 Sultan of Kelantan : Sultan Ismail
  Terengganu :
 Sultan of Terengganu : Sultan Sulaiman Badrul Alam Shah
  Selangor :
 British Residents of Selangor : Oswald Francis Gerard Stonor
 Sultan of Selangor : Sultan Alaeddin Sulaiman 
  Penang :
 Residents-Councillor : William Peel
  Malacca :
 Residents-Councillor : Ralph Scott 
  Negri Sembilan :
 British Residents of Negri Sembilan :
 Ernest Charteris Holford Wolff
 Yang di-Pertuan Besar of Negeri Sembilan :  Tuanku Muhammad Shah ibni Almarhum Tuanku Antah
   Pahang :
 British Residents of Pahang : Henry Wagstaffe Thomson
 Sultan of Pahang : Sultan Abu Bakar
  Perak :
 British Residents of Perak :
 Oswald Francis Gerard Stonor (from 20 December)
 Sultan of Perak : Sultan Abdul Aziz Al-Mutasim Billah Shah Ibni Almarhum Raja Muda Musa I

Events 
June – The Malaya cricket team records its only victory against a visiting Test side, in a game against Australia.

Births
 20 January – Richard Ho Ung Hun, civil servant (died 2008)
 4 April – Othman Saat, Menteri Besar (Chief Minister) of the state of Johor (died 2007)  
 28 November – Abdul Halim of Kedah, constitutional monarch (Yang di-Pertuan Agong) of Malaysia from 2011 to 2016, and Sultan of Kedah since 1958 
date unknown – Tan Jin Eong, badminton player (died 2014)

Deaths

See also
 1927
 History of Malaysia

References

1920s in British Malaya
Malaya